KDKJ-LD, virtual and UHF digital channel 27, is a low-powered television station licensed to Tyler, Texas, United States. Owned by HC2 Holdings, it is a sister station to KPKN-LD (channel 35).

History 
The construction permit for the station, originally assigned the call letters K27KJ-D, was issued by the Federal Communications Commission on February 25, 2010. The station signed on for the first time on June 22, 2015 as the Tyler area's new Estrella TV affiliated television station, with Azteca America carried on a second subchannel. NBC affiliate KETK-TV previously carried Estrella TV on its second subchannel from 2011 until KDKJ-LD's sign-on.

In December 2015, KDKJ-LD3 switched from DrTV to Sony Pictures Television's GetTV movie network, and KDKJ-LD4 was launched to carry FremantleMedia's Buzzr network.  As of April 2016, Buzzr has moved to KPKN-LD1.

Subchannels
The station's digital signal is multiplexed:

Coverage area 
The station's digital signal can only reach a  radius of the station's transmitter on the southwest side of the city.

References

External links
DTV America

Television stations in Texas
Low-power television stations in the United States
Television channels and stations established in 2014
2014 establishments in Texas
Innovate Corp.